Mark Pagett  was a Seventeenth century Irish Anglican priest.

A graduate of Trinity College, Dublin and Prebendary of Kileedy and Chancellor of Cork from 1632 to 1639 was the Dean of Ross, Ireland   until 1661.

References

Alumni of Trinity College Dublin
Deans of Ross, Ireland